The 1973 Campeonato Brasileiro Série A, (officially the Terceiro Campeonato Nacional de Clubes) was the 17th edition of the Campeonato Brasileiro Série A.

Overview
40 teams took part and Palmeiras won the championship.
The First Phase was contested in two turns. In the first, the forty teams were divided into two groups of twenty. Each team played once against the teams of its own group. In the second turn, the forty teams were divided into four groups of ten teams, and once again, the teams played only against the teams of their own group. The twenty best teams considering both first and second turns qualified to the Second phase.
The Second Phase saw the twenty qualified teams divided into two groups of ten. The teams within each group played each other in a single round-robin format. The two top teams from each group advanced to the Final phase.
The Final phase saw the four qualified teams play each other in a single round-robin tournament. The team with the most points won the Championship.

First phase

First turn

Group A

Group B

Second turn

Group 1

Group 2

Group 3

Group 4

Final standings

Second phase

Group 1

Group 2

Final phase

Final standings

References
 1973 Campeonato Brasileiro Série A at RSSSF

1973
1
Bra
B